Les Misérables is a 1934 film adaptation of Victor Hugo's 1862 novel of the same name. It was written and directed by Raymond Bernard and stars Harry Baur as Jean Valjean and Charles Vanel as Javert. The film lasts four and a half hours and is considered by critics to be the greatest adaptation of the novel, due to its more in-depth development of the themes and characters, in comparison with most shorter adaptations.

Although produced by Pathé it was not shot at the company's Joinville Studios in Paris but on a specially constructed set in Biot, Alpes-Maritimes as well as the nearby Victorine Studios in Nice. The film's sets were designed by the art directors Lucien Carré and Jean Perrier. The music, which is substantial, was written by the eminent Swiss composer Arthur Honegger. 

It was released as three films that premiered over a period of three weeks.
 Part One: Une tempête sous un crâne (Tempest in a Skull)
 Part Two: Les Thénardier (The Thenardiers)
 Part Three: Liberté, liberté chérie (Freedom, dear Freedom)

Plot
Jean Valjean is an ex-convict struggling to redeem himself, but his attempts are continually ruined by the intrusion of Javert. Javert is a cruel, ruthless police inspector who has dedicated his life to pursuing Valjean, whose only crime was stealing a loaf of bread, for which he received 5 years in jail.  He serves an additional 14 years for escape attempts.

The film, like the novel, features numerous other characters and subplots, such as Fantine, a woman forced into prostitution to pay two cruel innkeepers, the Thénardiers, for looking after her daughter Cosette, and the story of the revolutionaries, including Marius, a young man who falls in love later on in the film with the now-adult Cosette.

Cast
 Harry Baur as Jean Valjean & Champmathieu
 Charles Vanel as Javert
 Florelle as Fantine
 Josseline Gaël as Cosette
 Gaby Triquet as Cosette (child)
 Jean Servais as Marius
 Orane Demazis as Éponine
 Gilberte Savary as Éponine (child) 
 Lucien Nat as Montparnasse  
 Charles Dullin as Thénardier
 Marguerite Moreno as Madame Thénardier
 Émile Genevois as Gavroche
 Robert Vidalin as Enjolras
 Henry Krauss as Monseigneur Myriel
 Denise Mellot as Azelma
 Jacqueline Fermez as Azelma (child)
 Cailloux as Mabeuf
 Ginette d'Yd as Sister Simplice
 Pierre Piérade as Bamatabois
 Charlotte Barbier-Krauss as Toussaint
 Roland Armontel as Félix Tholomyès

Differences from the novel
The film is, for the most part, faithful to the original novel, however, there are some differences:
 Javert is presented as considerably less sympathetic than in the book, largely portraying him as the pinnacle of the cruelty in 19th century France.
 Valjean is released after having saved a house from caving in, not because his time is served.
 Not Fantine's last, but her first evening with Tholomyès is shown.
 Valjean's re-arrest after his escape from Montreuil's prison and escape from the "Orion" are omitted.
 Valjean and Cosette's stay at the Gorbeau House, their dodging of Javert and their arrival at the Petit-Picpus convent are omitted. After they leave the Thénardiers, the film jumps to Cosette's sixteenth birthday.
 Cosette and Marius are already lovers before the attack on Valjean in the Gorbeau House.
 Marius is already acquainted with Éponine and Gavroche before the attack at Gorbeau House.
 When Marius notifies Javert of the Thénardiers' plans, he is also able to give Javert Valjean's address, at least one of them. Javert comes to this address after the robbery and recognises Valjean there. Valjean has to flee to his other house, where he finds Marius and Cosette. After Marius reveals what he has done, expecting gratitude, Valjean sends him away. Only Cosette's pleas make him change his mind, but only after Marius left.
 Valjean does not meet Thénardier in the sewers.
 Valjean presents himself to Gillenormand when taking Marius home. Gillenormand, Marius and Cosette have therefore always known the identity of Marius' saviour.
 Valjean dies shortly after his confession to Marius, the day after the wedding, due to a wound which appeared to have become infected (probably due to the sewer water). He does not describe Fantine to Cosette.

Critical reaction
The film has been referred to as "the most complete and well rounded adaptation of Victor Hugo's classic novel". 

Raymond Bernard's version of Les Misérables was chosen by curator Robert Herbert as one of a number of films to support an exhibition of French drawings held in 2010 at the Art Gallery of New South Wales in Sydney, Australia. The Exhibition was entitled David to Cézanne: master drawings from the Prat Collection, Paris. It ran from 22 September until 5 December 2010. The film was screened 30 October, 3 November and 7 November in the Gallery's Domain Theatre.

Restoration and home video
The Criterion Collection released a restored version of Les Misérables in their Eclipse DVD line. Its three parts appeared alongside Bernard's Wooden Crosses (1932) in the Eclipse Series 4: Raymond Bernard collection (2007). This version, totalling 281 minutes (109:52, 85:21 and 86:36), is shorter than the reported 305 minute total runtime of the original release, though it is possible that time may be inaccurate, or includes brief intermissions no longer present. Criterion's DVD liner notes describe how the film was reissued at varying lengths over the following decades and was only restored to its approximate original length shortly before Bernard's death, minus some scenes that could not be recovered.

In 2013, Pathé carried out a brand new restoration of the film, totalling 289 minutes (115:39, 85:45 and 87:23), and released it on Blu-ray and DVD. Eureka Entertainment also released this version on Blu-ray and DVD in 2014, as part of their Masters of Cinema line.

See also
 Adaptations of Les Misérables
 List of longest films by running time

References

External links
 
 
 

1934 films
Films based on Les Misérables
1930s French-language films
French black-and-white films
Films directed by Raymond Bernard
1934 drama films
Films produced by Raymond Borderie
Films released in separate parts
Films scored by Arthur Honegger
Films shot at Victorine Studios
Films set in the 19th century
French historical drama films
1930s historical drama films
Pathé films
1930s French films